Seurre is a commune in the Côte-d'Or department in eastern France.

This commune lies at the crossroad of routes to Dijon, Chalon-sur-Saône, Dole, Beaune, and Louhans.

Population

See also
Communes of the Côte-d'Or department

References

External links

 Non official site of Seurre

Communes of Côte-d'Or
Burgundy